It Must Be Heaven is a 2019 internationally co-produced comedy film directed by, written by, and starring, Elia Suleiman. It was selected to compete for the Palme d'Or at the 2019 Cannes Film Festival. It was selected as the Palestinian entry for the Best International Feature Film at the 92nd Academy Awards, but it was not nominated.

Plot
A man escapes Palestine for a new beginning, only to encounter the same problems as back home.

Cast

Reception
The website's critics consensus reads: "An entrancing blend of the poignant and the absurd, It Must Be Heaven finds writer-director Elia Suleiman returning to action in peak form." On Metacritic, the film holds a rating of 69 out of 100, based on 8 reviews, indicating "generally favorable".

Awards
At the 2019 Cannes Film Festival, It Must Be Heaven received the FIPRESCI Prize for Best Film In Competition. At Cannes it also received a Special Mention.

At the 2019 Brussels International Film Festival (BRIFF), the film was awarded 4,000 € in broadcasting rights in Belgium.

See also
 List of submissions to the 92nd Academy Awards for Best International Feature Film
 List of Palestinian submissions for the Academy Award for Best International Feature Film

References

External links
 

2019 films
2019 comedy films
French comedy films
Canadian comedy films
Palestinian comedy films
Films about immigration
Films shot in Israel
Films shot in Paris
Films shot in Montreal
Films directed by Elia Suleiman
French-language Canadian films
2010s Canadian films
2010s French films